This is a list of Scottish football transfers featuring at least one 2022–23 Scottish Premiership club or one 2022–23 Scottish Championship club which were completed after the summer 2022 transfer window closed and before the end of the 2022–23 season.

List

See also
 List of Scottish football transfers summer 2022

References

Transfers
Scottish
2022 in Scottish sport
2023 winter
2023 in Scottish sport